The Nairobi Eastern Bypass Highway is a road in Kenya, forming a semi-circle through the south-eastern and north-eastern neighborhoods of the capital city of Nairobi. The road allows traffic from Mombasa, destined for the central parts of Kenya to bypass downtown Nairobi, thereby reducing traffic congestion in the city's central business district.

Location

The road then loops through the south-eastern suburbs of Nairobi, skirting the northern edges of Jomo Kenyatta International Airport, through Ruai. It then crosses from Nairobi County, into Kiambu County and turns westwards, passing underneath the Thika Highway and ends at the Ruiru Kamiti Road, at a place called Ruiru Road Junction. 

Overview
This road is intended to relieve traffic congestion in the capital city's central business district, by diverting long-distance traffic from and to the port city to Mombasa, destined for central Kenya and the counties directly north of Nairobi.

In a similar effort, other bypass highways have been built on the northern and southern sides of Nairobi, with the objective of alleviating downtown traffic congestion.

Construction
The Government of Kenya, though the Kenya National Highway Authority (KeNHA), built this highway and opened it to traffic in 2014. Initially constructed as  single carriageway road, efforts were initiated in 2017 to convert the highway into a four-lane dual carriageway road.

See also
 East African Community
 List of roads in Kenya
 List of bypass highways in Nairobi

References

External links
 Why you will soon be paying on the spot to use major roads As of 16 June 2018.

Roads in Kenya
Nairobi
Kiambu County
Transport infrastructure completed in 2014
2014 establishments in Kenya